David Kriegman is a professor of computer science and engineering at the University of California, San Diego, was named Fellow of the Institute of Electrical and Electronics Engineers (IEEE) in 2015 for contributions to computer vision.  Since 2007, he has also been the CEO and founder of Taaz, Inc.

He joined Two Sigma Investments in 2019 as an AI researcher.

Education
Stanford University, MS and Ph.D, both in Electrical Engineering (1984 and 1989 respectively)
Princeton University, BSE, Electrical Engineering and Computer Science, June, 1983. Summa cum laude.

References 

Fellow Members of the IEEE
Living people
University of California, San Diego faculty
Stanford University School of Engineering alumni
Princeton University alumni
Engineers from California
Year of birth missing (living people)
American electrical engineers